Table Top was a railway station on the Main South railway line in New South Wales, Australia. The station opened in 1881. The station consisted of a substantial brick station building and a signal box. It was demolished in the 1980s, you can still see some of it today.

References

Disused regional railway stations in New South Wales
Railway stations in Australia opened in 1881
Main Southern railway line, New South Wales